Affan Mitul (born 2 March 1988) is a Bangladeshi film actor. He made his debut in 2014 with national film award winning movie "Nekabborer Mohaproyan", after this movie he appearing in several films. In 2022, he acted in  a film as protagonist titled Moyna which was produced by Jaaz Multimedia. He plays the role of a "rockstar Roni" in this film. He has appeared in a number of released and upcoming films such as Adom, where he got as co artist Miss World Bangladesh fame Zannatul Ferdous Oishee  Gontobyo, Nishchup Bhalobasha, Nekabborer Mohaproyan, Horijon etc are Affan Mitul's acted some significant movies.

Early life and education
Affan Mitul was born on 2 March 1988 in Kishoreganj, Bangladesh. He completed his secondary from Government Laboratory High School and graduated from Daffodil International University in Journalism and Mass Communication.

Career 
Mitul has made his acting debut in 2007 with the television drama Antorale. The turning point of his Television career came in 2008 when he was cast in Humayun Ahmed's drama Nuruddin Swarno Padak. His debut film was Horijon (2014), which starred himself as the lead protagonist and Jayanta Chattopadhyay and Rokeya Prachi in supporting roles.

His first film as an adult was Nekabborer Mohaproyan which was released on 20 June, 2014. His first commercial film as a lead hero came in 2018 when he starred alongside debutant Sara Zerin in the film Nishchup Bhalobasha. The film was a moderate success at box office. Since then there is no looking for him. In 2020, He was roped in to play the role of a Salman Shah fan in the film Swapner Pheriwala. Actress Sheetal was cast opposite him in her debut film role. The film is set on 6 September 1996, the day of Salman Shah's demise. Mitul will play the role of fan who hears the news of his death on television and rushes to his home. In a dense crowd, he gets trampled and dies. The film is still in production. In 2021, He appeared in a patriotic film called Gontobyo which stars Ferdous Ahmed, Jayanta Chattopadhyay and Elina Shammi in lead roles. Till Now, he went on to appear in a total of 6 films. In 2022, four of his films got released which includes Adom, Moyna etc. Moyna which is produced by Jaaz Multimedia. He plays the role of a rockstar Roni in this film and actress Raj Ripa has played his love interest. In Adom, he is starred opposite Miss World Bangladesh 2018 Jannatul Ferdous Oishee. Singer Layla will make her film debut with the song "Konya Bisorjon",  which will be picturized on them.

Apart from films he has also appeared in several television dramas and web series. In July 2022, his web series Psycho Lover got released in which je plays a psycho lover who stalks a girl, played by Aurin. He appeared in a number of television dramas as well which includes Amio Ki Muktijoddha? (2018), Ghum Amay Dakchhe (2021) etc. In 2018, he played the role of a freedom fighter in Telefilm Amio Ki Muktijoddha? (i.e. Am I A Freedom Fighter?) He played the brother-in-law of actor Shajal Noor. It was telecast on 26 March 2018.

Till now, he has appeared in a total of 87 Television dramas and 11 films.

Filmography

Television

References

Living people
Bangladeshi Muslims
21st-century Bangladeshi male actors
Bangladeshi male television actors
1988 births